Sure Fire Flint is a 1922 American silent comedy film directed by Dell Henderson and starring Johnny Hines.

Cast
Johnny Hines as Sure Fire Flint
Edmund Breese as Johnny Jets
Robert Edeson as Anthony De Lanni
Effie Shannon as Mrs. De Lanni
J. Barney Sherry as The Proud Father
Doris Kenyon as June De Lanni
Charles K. Gerrard as Digby Poole

Preservation
With no prints of Sure Fire Flint located in any film archives, it is a lost film.

References

External links

1922 films
American silent feature films
Lost American films
Films directed by Dell Henderson
American black-and-white films
Silent American comedy films
Films with screenplays by Gerald Duffy
1922 comedy films
1922 lost films
Lost comedy films
1920s American films